Royal College is a tertiary institution in Addis Ababa, Ethiopia. It is one of a number of privately run colleges that emerged following the opening to private investment of the educational sector. The college provides degree, diploma and certificate training in Accounting, Law, Business Administration and Marketing management. It also offers certificates and diploma in these fields as well as in the Secretarial Science and Information Technology disciplines, among other studies.

References

Universities and colleges in Ethiopia
Educational institutions established in 1999
Education in Addis Ababa
1999 establishments in Ethiopia